Simon Sulaiman (born 1972) is a Syrian-born Dutch strongman competitor and entrant to the World's Strongest Man competition.

Biography
Simon Sulaiman was born in Syria in 1972 and moved to the Netherlands in 1989. He first came to prominence as a strength athlete with a fourth-place finish in the 2002 Strongest man of the Netherlands competition. Two years later he took second spot but it was not until 2009 that he finally won the competition in his adopted homeland. As a result of this he was invited to attend the 2009 World's Strongest Man as one two reserves. In 2008 and 2009 he was a regular competitor in the Strongman Champions League grand prix's though did not manage a podium finish.

He resides in the town of Almere.

He is also the head strength and conditioning trainer for Strikeforce Heavyweight Champion and K-1 standout Alistair Overeem.

Strongman competition record
 2002
 4. - Strongest man of the Netherlands
 2003
 5. - Strongest man of the Netherlands
 2004
 2. - Strongest man of the Netherlands
 2006
 11. - Strongest man of the Netherlands
 2007
 11. - Strongest man of the Netherlands
 2008
 11. - Strongest man of the Netherlands
 2009
 1. - Strongest man of the Netherlands

Best performances (powerlifting)
Squat - 300 kg
Deadlift - 360 kg

References

1972 births
Living people
Syrian strength athletes
Dutch strength athletes
20th-century Syrian people
21st-century Dutch people